Kevin Tod Smith (16 March 1963 – 15 February 2002) was a New Zealand actor and musician, best known for starring as the Greek god of war, Ares, in the TV series Hercules: The Legendary Journeys and in its two spin-offs – Xena: Warrior Princess and Young Hercules. He died in a fall at a film studio in China.

Early life 
Kevin Smith was born in Auckland in 1963. His mother was of Tongan and German ancestry and his father (of English descent) hailed from New Zealand. Smith's family moved to the South Island town of Timaru when he was eleven. He attended Timaru Boys' High School from 1976 to 1979. He was involved in the drama club at his high school.

Smith played in rock and roll bands during high school, working out each morning at the gym and watching television in the afternoon. He painted and played rugby and hoped to become a member of New Zealand's world-famous rugby team, the All Blacks.

At the age of 17, Smith moved to Christchurch, where he lived in a flat above a fruit shop, worked at various jobs, and considered joining the police to help children, before enrolling in Canterbury University at the age of 20. In 1986 he married his high school sweetheart, Suzanne (Sue), with whom he had three sons: Oscar, Tyrone, and Willard.

Career 
Smith played in several lo-fi experimental bands in New Zealand and released a few albums with Say Yes to Apes and Hyphen-Ears in the mid-1980s.

After suffering a concussion while playing university rugby union in 1987, Smith was forced to sit on the sidelines for almost three weeks. His wife saw a casting call advertisement for the touring musical tribute to Elvis Presley, Are You Lonesome Tonight, and signed up Kevin for an audition. He got the role of bodyguard JoJoe and was the lead understudy. Later that year, Smith joined Christchurch's Court Theatre and performed on stage for the next three years in a variety of roles including Don Pedro in Shakespeare's Much Ado About Nothing and Stanley Kowalski in Tennessee Williams' A Streetcar Named Desire.

In 1989, Smith co-founded a Christchurch theatresports group, Scared Scriptless, performing live comedy. Later that year he got the role of charming "bad boy" Demian Vermeer on the New Zealand primetime soap opera Gloss, and moved to Auckland to work on the series' final season.

In 1993, Smith played Lawrence Hayes in Desperate Remedies. He then appeared as Paul Cosic in the last two seasons of the primetime drama Marlin Bay. For this role, he won the 1995 New Zealand Film and Television Award for Best Supporting Actor.

He screen-tested for the lead role in Paramount's big budget action-film The Phantom, but the role ultimately went to Billy Zane instead. His fellow Hercules: The Legendary Journeys cast member, low-budget-movie actor and Pacific Renaissance Pictures partner Bruce Campbell, was also one of the contenders for the role of the legendary superhero.

Also in 1995, Smith appeared on Hercules: The Legendary Journeys as Hercules' half-brother, Iphicles. Later he joined the cast of Xena: Warrior Princess, as Ares, a role he would later play on Hercules and Young Hercules as well. As the dark and dangerously seductive Greek god of war, Smith gained legions of fans. During this time Kevin performed as Ares on Hercules: The Legendary Journeys, Xena: Warrior Princess and Young Hercules simultaneously.

While starring on Xena, Hercules and Young Hercules, Smith also appeared in other TV shows and films, notably as a Vietnam veteran in the feature film Channelling Baby and as detective John Lawless in three TV movies: Lawless (1999), Lawless 2: Dead Evidence (2000), and Lawless 3: Beyond Justice (2001). In the mockumentary Love Mussel (2001) he played himself covering the story of a small town in New Zealand following the discovery that a local shellfish, the geoduck, has similar effects to Viagra.

Smith also continued to act in the theatre. During his career, he also appeared on several cassettes of alternative music, alongside other musicians, under the band names "The Picnic Boys" and "Say Yes to Apes" which was later renamed "Hyphen-Smythe". He was one of the lead singers of the celebrity band "The Wide Lapels", a band famous for its campy performances of the worst songs of the 1970s.

Death
Early in 2002, Smith (who was preparing for his first Hollywood role in the Bruce Willis action film Tears of the Sun) went to China to shoot the US-Chinese martial arts film Warriors of Virtue 2.

On 6 February 2002, Smith completed his work on the set in Shijiazhuang, 270 km southwest of Beijing. After celebrating with staff from Beijing Film Studio, and while waiting for a ride back to the hotel, he decided to walk around the Central China Television film studio grounds, and climbed a prop tower on the set of another film. He lost his footing and fell three stories, suffering severe head injuries. Smith was rushed by staff to a local hospital, then transferred to Beijing. He lapsed into a coma and was kept on life support for ten days until life support was discontinued. He died on 15 February without regaining consciousness.

Smith was buried after a private funeral on 28 February 2002. The launch of the Kevin Smith Trust for Smith's children was announced later that day at a memorial service attended by old friends, New Zealand's acting community, and over a thousand mourners at the Aotea Centre, Auckland.

A television documentary celebrating Smith's life and career, Remembering Kev: A Tribute to Kevin Smith, aired on TV2 on the first anniversary of his death.

Works

Discography

Albums with Say Yes to Apes 
1983 Who's That
1983 "Knife" (single)
1984 So Who Owns Death TV?

Albums with Hyphen-Ears 
1984 What Are Stars? The Stars Are What Separates Us from the Animals You Sonovabitch!

Filmography

Starring roles

Guest appearances

References

External links 
 A Tribute to Kevin Smith on NZ On Screen featuring excerpts from many of his on screen appearances and tributes from his friends

 See Ares/Kevin Smith's props and costumes at The Xena Museum

1963 births
2002 deaths
New Zealand male television actors
University of Canterbury alumni
People educated at Timaru Boys' High School
Accidental deaths from falls
Accidental deaths in the People's Republic of China
New Zealand people of English descent
New Zealand people of German descent
New Zealand people of Tongan descent
People from Auckland
Musicians from Auckland
People from Timaru